A 2nd Hand Lover is a 2015 Indian Kannada language romance film directed by Raghav Marasur (Raghava Loki). It stars Ajay Rao, Pranitha Subhash and Anisha Ambrose. The film is about the life of a rock star. The core plot of the movie was loosely based on the 2004 South Korean movie 100 Days with Mr. Arrogant.

Plot
An aspiring rockstar with his own band, Ajai (Ajay Rao) comes to Bangalore from his town. He aspires to make it big in the rock music industry. At the same time, he nurses his broken heart for losing his girlfriend (Pranitha) in an accident. He prepares his band to perform in a competition held in Bangalore. He meets Anjali (Anisha), a college student who breaks his car's side view mirror, by accident while traveling. Following several similar encounters, Anjali eventually develops feelings for Ajai. But Ajai, having a sad past of lost love, is reluctant to reciprocate his love for Anjali. The rest of the plot is about how Anjali wins over Ajai.

Cast

Reception

The film received moderated positive reviews. Times of India gave 2.5 stars out of 5 and stated, "The film could have been a clincher, for it has all the elements of a family drama, had it been shorter. Though, watch it once, if you must."

Soundtrack

Gurukiran composed the film's background score and music for its soundtrack. The soundtrack album was released on 29 May 2015 and consists of six tracks.

References

External links
 

2010s romantic musical films
Indian rock music films
Indian romantic musical films
Films scored by Gurukiran
2010s Kannada-language films
Indian remakes of South Korean films